The 1969 National Invitation Tournament was originated by the Metropolitan Basketball Writers Association in 1938. Responsibility for its administration was transferred two years later to local colleges, first known as the Metropolitan Intercollegiate Basketball Committee and in 1948, as the Metropolitan Intercollegiate Basketball Association (MIBA), which comprised representatives from five New York City schools: Fordham University, Manhattan College, New York University, St. John's University, and Wagner College. Originally all of the teams qualifying for the tournament were invited to New York City, and all games were played at Madison Square Garden.

Selected teams
Below is a list of the 16 teams selected for the tournament.

 Army
 Boston College
 Florida
 Fordham
 Kansas
 Louisville
 Ohio
 Rutgers
 Saint Peter's
 South Carolina
 Southern Illinois
 Temple
 Tennessee
 Tulsa
 West Texas State
 Wyoming

Bracket
Below is the tournament bracket.

See also
 1969 NCAA University Division basketball tournament
 1969 NCAA College Division basketball tournament
 1969 NAIA Division I men's basketball tournament
 1969 National Women's Invitational Tournament

References

National Invitation
National Invitation Tournament
Basketball in New York City
College sports in New York City
Madison Square Garden
National Invitation Tournament
National Invitation Tournament
Sports competitions in New York City
Sports in Manhattan
1960s in Manhattan